The Little Thing (French: Le petit chose) is a 1938 French drama film directed by Maurice Cloche and starring Robert Lynen, Arletty and Marcelle Barry. It is based on Alphonse Daudet's 1868 novel Le Petit Chose.

Cast

References

Bibliography 
 Parish, James Robert. Film Actors Guide. Scarecrow Press, 1977.

External links 
 

1938 films
French drama films
1938 drama films
1930s French-language films
Films directed by Maurice Cloche
Films based on French novels
Films based on works by Alphonse Daudet
French black-and-white films
1930s French films